Akeridae is a small taxonomic family of sea snails, marine gastropod molluscs belonging to the superfamily Akeroidea, the sea hares.  The family, in its original spelling "Aceridae", has previously been attributed in error to Pilsbry, 1893.

Akeridae is the only family in the superfamily.

Genera
The only genus of the family is:
 Genus Akera O. F. Müller, 1776 - type genus

References

External links

 Miocene Gastropods and Biostratigraphy of the Kern River Area, California; United States Geological Survey Professional Paper 642 

 
Gastropod families